The 1919Mecklenburg-Strelitz state election was held on 30 March 1919 to elect the 35 members of the Landtag of the Free State of Mecklenburg-Strelitz.

Results

References 

Mecklenburg-Strelitz
Elections in Mecklenburg-Western Pomerania